Traube is a German surname meaning "grape". Notable people with the surname include:

Hermann Traube (1860–1913), German mineralogist
Klaus Traube (born 1928), prominent German opponent of nuclear power
Ludwig Traube (physician) (1818–1876), physician
Ludwig Traube (palaeographer) (1861–1907), palaeographer
Moritz Traube (1826–1894), German chemist
Wilhelm Traube (1866–1942), German chemist

Medicine 
Traube's space

See also
Traub

German-language surnames